The 2022 European Road Cycling Championships will be the 28th running of the European Road Cycling Championships, set to place from 14 to 21 August 2022 in Munich, Germany for the elite events, and from 7 to 10 July 2022 in Anadia, Portugal for under-23 and junior events. The event will consist of a total of 6 road races and 8 time trials.

Medal summary

Elite

Under-23

Junior

Mixed events

Medal table

References

External links 
Munich 2022
Anadia 2022
Results book – Munich 2022

 
European Road Championships by year
European Road Championships, 2022
Road
European Road Championships
European Road Championships
2022 European Championships